Georgina Theodora Wood  (née Lutterodt; born 8 June 1947) is a Ghanaian judge and also a former police prosecution officer. She was the Chief Justice of Ghana and the first woman to occupy that position. She retired in 2017 after five decades of service to the state. She is a member of the Council of State.

Early life and education
Georgina Lutterodt was born on 8 June 1947 in Ghana. She had her basic education at Bishop's Girls and Methodist Schools, Dodowa. She next attended Mmofraturo Girls School, Kumasi between 1958 and 1960. Wood's secondary education was at Wesley Girls' High School, Cape Coast, which she completed in 1966. She proceeded to the University of Ghana, Legon, where she was awarded the LL.B. in 1970. Wood then attended the Ghana School of Law after which she was called to the bar. She also did a Post-Graduate Officers Training Course at the Ghana Police College.

Career
Wood worked with the Ghana Police Service as a deputy superintendent and public prosecutor for three years. She later joined the Judicial Service as a District Magistrate in 1974. She rose through the Circuit and High Courts to become the presiding judge of the Appeal Court in 1991. She was appointed to the Supreme Court by President John Kufuor on 12 November 2002, an appointment she had earlier declined.

Georgina Wood committee
The Georgina Wood committee was set up on 4 July 2006 to investigate the disappearance from a shipping vessel MV Benjamin of 77 packets of cocaine on 26 April 2006. It was also to investigate an alleged 200,000 dollars bribe paid to senior police officers by a lady linked to a Venezuelan drug baron, and also the 588 kg of cocaine seized at Mempeasem, East Legon from the Venezuelans.

Chief Justice of Ghana 
She was nominated for the position of Chief Justice of Ghana in May 2007. On 1 June 2007,the Parliament of Ghana approved her nomination as the new Chief Justice of Ghana by consensus. As at June 2007, this made her the first woman in the history of Ghana to head the Judiciary and also made her at the time, the highest ranked female in Ghana's political history; that rank was surpassed by the appointment of Justice Joyce Adeline Bamford-Addo as Speaker of the 5th Parliament of Ghana's 4th Republic in January 2009.  Chief Justice Wood assumed office on 15 June 2007. While in office, she swore-in four Presidents: the President John Evans Atta-Mills in January 2009, Vice-president John Dramani Mahama upon the death of Atta-Mills on 24 July 2012, President-Elect John Dramani Mahama, winner of the December 2012 General Elections on 7 January 2013,  Nana Akuffo-Addo, winner of the December 2016 elections on 7 January 2017. She retired as Chief Justice in June 2017. She was succeeded by Justice Sophia Akuffo.

Council of State
On 20 June 2017, Wood was sworn in by President Nana Akuffo-Addo as the 25th and final member of the Council of State. She is on the council by virtue of the fact that she is a former Chief Justice. It was the first time in 22 years that the vacancy had been filled as Ghana had had no living retired Chief Justice since 1995.

Honours
On 7 July 2007, Wood was decorated with the Order of the Star of Ghana, the nation's highest honour. She was presented by President John Kufuor.

Other roles
Wood is a choir leader at the Ringway Gospel Centre Assemblies of God Church, Accra. She is also the Chairperson of the Alternative Dispute Resolution in Ghana. She has also served as a member of the Kenya Judges and Magistrates Vetting Board. She serves on the board of the Global Justice Center, an international human rights law organization based in New York City.

Family
Wood is married to Edwin Wood, a retired banker.

Controversies

September 2008 NPP Land Allocation
On Thursday 7 October 2010, Wood was among 15 people named by the Committee for Joint Action as a beneficiary of allegedly illegal land allocation by the former NPP government. In an official statement, the committee claimed:

According to Accra urban redevelopment researcher Tom Gillespie:

See also
Chief Justice of Ghana
First women lawyers around the world
List of judges of the Supreme Court of Ghana
Supreme Court of Ghana
Judiciary of Ghana

References

External links

Pictures from vetting by Parliament of Ghana

1947 births
Living people
20th-century Ghanaian judges
21st-century Ghanaian judges
University of Ghana alumni
Recipients of the Order of the Star of Ghana
Constitutional court women judges
Women chief justices
Ghanaian women judges
Members of the Council of State (Ghana)
Justices of the Supreme Court of Ghana
Former Methodists
20th-century women judges
21st-century women judges